Pleasant Lake may refer to:

Lakes
Pleasant Lake (Maine), in Aroostook County
Pleasant Lake (Crooked River), in Cumberland and Oxford counties, Maine
Pleasant Lake (Waterford Township, Michigan), in Oakland County
Pleasant Lake (Deerfield, New Hampshire), in Rockingham County
Pleasant Lake (New London, New Hampshire), in Merrimack County
Pleasant Lake (Macomb, St. Lawrence County, New York)
Pleasant Lake (Stratford, New York), in Fulton County

Communities
Canada:
Pleasant Lake, a community in Yarmouth County, Nova Scotia

United States:
Pleasant Lake, Indiana
Pleasant Lake, Massachusetts
Pleasant Lake, Michigan
Pleasant Lake, Minnesota
Pleasant Lake, North Dakota
Pleasant Lake Township, Benson County, North Dakota

See also
Lake Pleasant (disambiguation)
Pleasant Lake station (disambiguation)
Pleasant Pond, in Caratunk, Maine